Resonance is an album by Jordan Rudess recorded and released in 1999.

The album fits with Rudess' "lighter side" along with Secrets of the Muse, 4NYC, Christmas Sky and Notes on a Dream.  The tracks are primarily improvised on synthesizers.

Track listing
All tracks are composed by Jordan Rudess.
"Resonance" – 9:55
"Timeline" – 10:27
"Flying" – 10:45
"Catharsis" – 5:15
"Tears" – 4:09

Personnel
Jordan Rudess - Piano, Keyboards

1999 albums
Jordan Rudess albums